is a vertically scrolling shooter-maze game released by Sega as an arcade game in April 1981. The player controls a jeep and has to destroy enemy refineries. There are four stages with different gameplay. The first stage plays like a vertically scrolling shooter. In the second stage, the player maneuvers his Jeep through underbrush, and enemies can only follow on its path, a concept later found in Namco's Dig Dug (1982).

Borderline was reissued later in the year with slightly altered graphics as Star Raker. Borderline was later a launch game for the SG-1000 in 1983. It was also converted for the Atari 2600 under the name Thunderground, released by Sega's home division; it was one of the last games Sega released as a third-party developer for Atari. The SG-1000 and Atari 2600 ports received positive reviews from critics.

Reception
E.C. Meade and Jim Clark of Videogaming Illustrated magazine reviewed the Atari 2600 version Thunderground in 1983. Despite the original Borderline predating Dig Dug and Mr. Do! (1982), the reviewers were under the impression that Thunderground was a "semi-clone" of Dig Dug and Mr. Do! Despite this, they gave it positive reviews. Meade gave it an A rating; she said "there are superficial similarities to Dig Dug and Mr. Do" but Thunderground "is a semi-clone with muscle!" She called it "a real challenge" to play, stating "What a game!" Clark gave it a B rating, calling it "a thrilling game" and very "good stuff" but said "the sense of deja-vu detracted from its appeal" while also commenting on its "violence" though he didn't "think anyone will be too bothered."

French magazine Tilt reviewed the SG-1000 version of Borderline in 1984. They gave the game an overall rating of 5 out of 6 stars, while giving 5 stars for the graphics and 4 stars for the sound.

In a retrospective review of the SG-1000 version in 2014, Sega Does gave it a generally favorable review with a B− rating.

References

External links
Thunderground at Atari Mania

1981 video games
Arcade video games
Gremlin Industries games
Sega arcade games
SG-1000 games
Shoot 'em ups
Video games developed in Japan